Gunnery Sergeant Robert Howard McCard (November 25, 1918 – June 16, 1944), a United States Marine, received the Medal of Honor (posthumously) for his actions during the Battle of Saipan in World War II.

Biography
Robert Howard McCard, born at Syracuse, New York, November 25, 1918, enlisted in the Marine Corps December 18, 1939. Shortly after the United States declared war against Japan in 1941, he was assigned to the Naval Training Station, Great Lakes, Illinois; then the Training Center, Quantico, Virginia; Camp Lejeune, North Carolina; and Camp Pendleton, California. He served in the field from January 31, 1944, until he was killed in action at Saipan on June 16, 1944.

Medal of Honor citation
The President of the United States takes pride in presenting the MEDAL OF HONOR posthumously to

for service as set forth in the following CITATION:

For conspicuous gallantry and intrepidity at the risk of his life above and beyond the call of duty while serving as Platoon Sergeant of Company A, Fourth Tank Battalion, Fourth Marine Division, during the battle for enemy Japanese-held Saipan, Mariana Islands, on June 16, 1944. Cut off from the other units of his platoon when his tank was put out of action by a battery of enemy 77-mm. guns, Gunnery Sergeant McCard carried on resolutely, bringing all the tank's weapons to bear on the enemy, until the severity of hostile fire caused him to order his crew out the escape hatch while he courageously exposed himself to enemy guns by hurling hand grenades, in order to cover the evacuation of his men. Seriously wounded during this action and with his supply of grenades exhausted, Gunnery Sergeant McCard dismantled one of the Tank's machine guns and faced the Japanese for the second time to deliver vigorous fire into positions, destroying sixteen of the enemy but sacrificing himself to ensure the safety of his crew. His valiant fighting spirit and supreme loyalty in the face of almost certain death reflect the highest credit upon Gunnery Sergeant McCard and the United States Naval Service. He gallantly gave his life for his country.

/S/ FRANKLIN D. ROOSEVELT

Posthumous honors

See also

List of Medal of Honor recipients

References
This article includes text in the public domain from the Dictionary of American Naval Fighting Ships and from the United States Marine Corps.

External links

1918 births
1944 deaths
United States Marine Corps non-commissioned officers
United States Marine Corps Medal of Honor recipients
United States Marine Corps personnel killed in World War II
World War II recipients of the Medal of Honor
Burials in the National Memorial Cemetery of the Pacific
Tank commanders